Hans Müller (born 1949) is a former Grand Prix motorcycle road racer from Switzerland. His best year was in 1979 when he finished in third place in the 125cc world championship.

References
 Hans Müller career statistics at MotoGP.com

1949 births
Living people
Swiss motorcycle racers
50cc World Championship riders
125cc World Championship riders
250cc World Championship riders
80cc World Championship riders